Tom Peluso is an American retired ice hockey right wing who was an All-American for Denver.

Career
Peluso helped his high school team, Greenway, make consecutive tournament appearances in the state tournament in 1969 and '70. He performed so well that he was one of the few American players recruited to Denver by Murray Armstrong. Peluso swiftly proved that he belonged by finishing third on the team in scoring with 51 points and helped the pioneers win a conference co-championship and return to the national tournament. The following season Peluso led the Pioneers with 69 points, winning both the regular season and tournament championships in the WCHA. He was named as an All-American and finished 4th in the nation in scoring but Denver lost the national semifinal for the second year in a row and ended up 4th for the tournament.

After Denver's season ended, Peluso joined the US National Team for the 1972 Ice Hockey World Championships. The team was looking for a promotion to the top division after being relegated the year before. The team ended up second in their division, being denied promotion due to a 5–6 loss to Poland. Despite the unfortunate result, Peluso was selected by the Chicago Blackhawks in the 1972 NHL Draft, joining the growing number of college players being considered by pro teams.

Rather than return to Denver, Peluso embarked on a professional career and joined the Dallas Black Hawks in 1972. He missed part of his first season with a torn abdominal muscle but played well enough that, after two years with the club, including the 1974 Adams Cup, he was chosen by the Kansas City Scouts in the Expansion Draft. Peluso was a rising star for the Scouts in 1975, finishing 4th on the Port Huron Flags with 56 points. His professional career was cut short the following year by injuries and he returned home to Grand Rapids.

Personal life
Peluso's brother Jim played hockey at Denver as well. The two played together in Tom's sophomore season. He had two other family members play college hockey as well; cousin Mike (born 1965) played for Alaska Anchorage and later won a Stanley Cup with the New Jersey Devils while nephew Mike (born 1974) played for Minnesota Duluth and retired after 38 games in the NHL.

Career statistics

Regular season and playoffs

Awards and honors

References

External links

1952 births
Living people
American ice hockey right wingers
Ice hockey players from Minnesota
Sportspeople from Grand Rapids, Minnesota
Denver Pioneers men's ice hockey players
Chicago Blackhawks draft picks
Dallas Black Hawks players
Port Huron Flags players
Toledo Goaldiggers players
AHCA Division I men's ice hockey All-Americans